The 1964 PGA Tour season was played from January 3 to November 22. The season consisted of 44 official money events. Tony Lema won the most tournaments, five, and there were seven first-time winners. Jack Nicklaus was the leading money winner with earnings of $113,285. Ken Venturi was voted the PGA Player of the Year and Arnold Palmer won the Vardon Trophy for the lowest scoring average.

Schedule
The following table lists official events during the 1964 season.

Unofficial events
The following events were sanctioned by the PGA Tour, but did not carry official money, nor were wins official.

Money leaders
The money list was based on prize money won during the season, calculated in U.S. dollars.

Awards

Notes

References

External links
PGA Tour official site

PGA Tour seasons
PGA Tour